Ingo Appelt (born 11 December 1961 in Innsbruck) is an Austrian bobsledder who competed from the late 1980s to early 1992.

He was Bobsleigh World Cup combined men's champion in 1987–8, and four-man champion in 1987-8 and 1988–9. Competing in two Winter Olympics, Appelt won the gold medal in the four-man event at Albertville in 1992. He also won a bronze medal in the four-man event at the 1990 FIBT World Championships in St. Moritz. Appelt retired from bobsledding at the 1992 games.

Appelt became a Member of Tyrolean Parliament for the Freedom Party of Austria, but meanwhile he works again as a jeweller and jewellery designer in Fulpmes.

References
Bobsleigh four-man Olympic medalists for 1924, 1932-56, and since 1964
Bobsleigh four-man world championship medalists since 1930
DatabaseOlympics.com profile
List of combined men's bobsleigh World Cup champions: 1985-2007
List of four-man bobsleigh World Cup champions since 1985

1961 births
Sportspeople from Innsbruck
Living people
Austrian male bobsledders
Austrian jewellers
Austrian politicians
Bobsledders at the 1988 Winter Olympics
Bobsledders at the 1992 Winter Olympics
Olympic bobsledders of Austria
Olympic gold medalists for Austria
Olympic medalists in bobsleigh
Medalists at the 1992 Winter Olympics
Recipients of the Decoration of Honour for Services to the Republic of Austria